Mount Vernon Independent School District is a school district based in Mount Vernon, Texas, United States. Located in Franklin County, a very small portion of the district extends into Hopkins County.

Schools
 Mount Vernon High School (grades 9–12)
 Mount Vernon Junior High School (grades 7–8)
 Mount Vernon Intermediate School (grades 5–6)
 Mount Vernon Elementary School (grades PK–4)

References

External links
 

School districts in Franklin County, Texas
School districts in Hopkins County, Texas